Edinburgh and St Andrews Universities was a university constituency represented in the House of Commons of the Parliament of the United Kingdom from 1868 until 1918. It was merged with the Glasgow and Aberdeen Universities constituency to form the Combined Scottish Universities constituency.

Electorate
As a university constituency, the constituency had no geographical basis.  Instead, its electorate consisted of graduates from the University of Edinburgh and the University of St Andrews.

Members of Parliament

Election results

Elections in the 1910s

Elections in the 1900s

Elections in the 1890s

 Pearson was raised to the Bench, as a Senator of the College of Justice.

 Stormonth-Darling was raised to the Bench, as a Senator of the College of Justice.

Elections in the 1880s

 Caused by Macdonald's appointment as Lord Justice Clerk, becoming Lord Kingsburgh.

 Caused by Macdonald being appointed Lord Advocate.

At Edinburgh Playfair had received 1,742 votes and Bickersteth 1526, and at St Andrew's Playfair received 512 votes and Bickersteth 698. Eleven of Dr Playfair's ballot papers had not been counted ″Owing to certain information″.

Elections in the 1870s

 Caused by Playfair's appointment as Postmaster General of the United Kingdom.

Elections in the 1860s

References

Historic parliamentary constituencies in Scotland (Westminster)
Constituencies of the Parliament of the United Kingdom disestablished in 1918
Constituencies of the Parliament of the United Kingdom established in 1868
University constituencies of the Parliament of the United Kingdom
History of the University of Edinburgh
University of St Andrews
Higher education in Scotland